Madikheda Dam is a multi-purpose dam situated in Shivpuri district in Madhya Pradesh, India. Before independence it comes under control of Rajpoot chiefs of Raipur Dhamkan which is seat of Thakur who comes from Pawaiya Chauhan clan. Chauhans of Raipur was one among the most dominating powers in this region. Thakur Shree Niranjan Sinh Pawaiya was the current Chief of Raipur that time and had issued three sons Shree Balvant sinh was the eldest one Shree Mehtav sinh and shree Parikshit sinh the youngest one. Shree Parikshit sinh became first separate and independent chieftain or Pradhan of Madikheda along with some other villages under the Raipur Dhamkan. later Thakur Jihan sinh Pawaiya son of Thakur,  Parikshit sinh took over the position and throne of Thakur. Thakore sahib Lambardar Shree Jihan sinh Pawaiya was the last pradhan chieftain of Madikheda. the former village of Madikheda was affected by dam project on Sindh river with many other villages on the bank of river in 1975 -1977.

Specification
Length of Dam - 1070 meter
Length of spillway - 176.50 meter
Full Reservoir Level - 346.25 meter
Maximum Water Level - 346.85 meter
 Catchment area - 5540 km2
Submergence area - 5672.91 ha
 Villages affected - 13
Dam height - 62 m
No. of gates - 10
Year of start - 1978
Project benefits
Culturable command area - 98.25 th.ha
Ultimate potential - 162.0 th. ha
Districts benefitted - Gwalior, Shivpuri, Datia, Bhind
Hydro power - 60 MW (20x3)
Year of completion - 2008

See also

River Basins in Madhya Pradesh
:Category:Dams in Madhya Pradesh

References 

Dams in Madhya Pradesh
Hydroelectric power stations in Madhya Pradesh
Shivpuri district
Dams completed in 2008
2008 establishments in Madhya Pradesh

Local sources and Archeological surveys of India .